Paget Island is part of the chain which makes up Bermuda. It is located in St. George's Parish, in the northeast of the territory.

Namesake
The 36 acre (14.5 hectare) island is located at the northern entrance to St. George's Harbor, east of the town of St. George's and just to the north of the slightly larger Smith's Island. In the past Paget and nearby Smith's Island were used as whaling centers. Paget Island takes its name from William Paget, the fourth Lord of Paget, but before that was also known as Pennystones.

Fort Cunningham
The island's most prominent feature is Fort Cunningham, when the first Governor Richard Moore came in 1612 he recognized that Paget Island was the route from St. George to the Atlantic and any enemy vessel would come through here, the first battery built as far back as 1612, expanded in 1619, major works continued in the 1700s and 1800s, it is of historical importance, but now in a state of disrepair. In 1746 due to the high number of Prisoners of War  and again during World War II it served as an internment camp for Germans and Austrians.

Visiting
The island itself is not easily accessible due to no regular ferry service. With advance permission from the Bermuda Government's Department of Youth, Sport and Recreation  campers may stay on a 20-acre campsite, but only one group at a time.

References

Islands of Bermuda
St. George's Parish, Bermuda
World War II sites in Bermuda